John Yang (1933 – 2009) was an American architect and photographer.

Early life 
Born in China, he settled in the United States with his family in 1939. His interest in photography began as a child and was later developed when he was a student at The Putney School in Vermont where he was classmates with other future photographers such as Tim Asch. In the summer of 1951, he studied with Minor White at The California School of the Fine Arts. He graduated from Harvard College majoring in Philosophy, and in 1957 he earned a MA in Architecture from the University of Pennsylvania studying under Louis Kahn.  Before becoming a photographer full-time, Yang worked as an architect and continued in that practice until 1978.

Career 
One of his photographs, "Blindman's Bluff", that was taken at Strasbourg, France in 1960, was edited and used by the band Sigur Ros for their 2002 album.

The John Yang Archive is at the Center for Creative Photography at the University of Arizona.

Personal life
Yang's daughter is the American musician, graphic designer, photographer, and filmmaker Naomi Yang (b. 1964).

References 

1933 births
2009 deaths
University of Pennsylvania School of Design alumni
Harvard College alumni
20th-century American architects
20th-century American photographers
The Putney School alumni
American architects of Chinese descent
American artists of Chinese descent